The 1907 South Kilkenny by-election was held on 29 July 1907.  The by-election was held due to the resignation of the incumbent Irish Parliamentary MP, James O'Mara, who joined Sinn Féin.  It was won by the Irish Parliamentary candidate Nicholas Joseph Murphy, who was unopposed.

References

By-elections to the Parliament of the United Kingdom in County Kilkenny constituencies
South Kilkenny by-election
South Kilkenny by-election
Unopposed by-elections to the Parliament of the United Kingdom (need citation)
1907 elections in Ireland